Murrumbidgee, an electoral district of the Legislative Assembly in the Australian state of New South Wales, has existed from the establishment of the Legislative Assembly in 1855 until its abolition in 2011.


Election results

Elections in the 2010s

2011

Elections in the 2000s

2007

2003

Elections in the 1990s

1999

1995

1991

Elections in the 1980s

1988

1984

1981

Elections in the 1970s

1978

1976

1973

1971

1970 by-election

Elections in the 1960s

1968

1965

1962

Elections in the 1950s

1959

1956

1953

1950

Elections in the 1940s

1947

1944

1941

Elections in the 1930s

1938

1935

1932

1930

Elections in the 1920s

1927

1925

1922

1920

Elections in the 1910s

1917

1913

1910

Elections in the 1900s

1907

1904

1901

Elections in the 1890s

1898
This section is an excerpt from 1898 New South Wales colonial election § The Murrumbidgee

1895
This section is an excerpt from 1895 New South Wales colonial election § The Murrumbidgee

1894
This section is an excerpt from 1894 New South Wales colonial election § The Murrumbidgee

1893 by-election

1891
This section is an excerpt from 1891 New South Wales colonial election § The Murrumbidgee

Elections in the 1880s

1889
This section is an excerpt from 1889 New South Wales colonial election § The Murrumbidgee

1887
This section is an excerpt from 1887 New South Wales colonial election § The Murrumbidgee

1885
This section is an excerpt from 1885 New South Wales colonial election § The Murrumbidgee

1882
This section is an excerpt from 1882 New South Wales colonial election § The Murrumbidgee

1880
This section is an excerpt from 1880 New South Wales colonial election § The Murrumbidgee

Elections in the 1870s

1877
This section is an excerpt from 1877 New South Wales colonial election § The Murrumbidgee

1876 by-election

1874-75
This section is an excerpt from 1874-75 New South Wales colonial election § The Murrumbidgee

1872
This section is an excerpt from 1872 New South Wales colonial election § The Murrumbidgee

Elections in the 1860s

1869-70
This section is an excerpt from 1869-70 New South Wales colonial election § The Murrumbidgee

1864-65
This section is an excerpt from 1864–65 New South Wales colonial election § The Murrumbidgee

1860
This section is an excerpt from 1860 New South Wales colonial election § The Murrumbidgee

Elections in the 1850s

1859
This section is an excerpt from 1859 New South Wales colonial election § The Murrumbidgee

1858
This section is an excerpt from 1858 New South Wales colonial election § Murrumbidgee

1856
This section is an excerpt from 1856 New South Wales colonial election § Murrumbidgee

Notes

References

New South Wales state electoral results by district